The Kulumali were an indigenous Australian people of the state of Queensland.

Country
Norman Tindale estimated that Kulumali territory occupied some  centering on the area around Windorah and Kyabra Creek.

People
Very little is known of the Kulumali, who were extinct by the second half of the twentieth century. The linguist Gavan Breen could ascertain nothing regarding them while undertaking research among other tribal remnants in the 1960s. The Wongkumara remembered them as having furnished that tribe with a corroboree that was new to them. It is also known that they were one of the three easternmost tribes in Queensland that undertook initiatory rites of circumcision.

Alternative names
 Ngulangulanji.

Notes

Citations

Sources

Aboriginal peoples of Queensland